Filippo Tagliani (born 14 August 1995) is an Italian cyclist who currently rides for UCI ProTeam .

Major results

2016
 3rd Overall Gemenc Grand Prix
2017
 1st Overall Gemenc Grand Prix
1st Points classification
1st Young rider classification
1st Prologue & Stage 1
 Challenge du Prince
7th Trophée de la Maison Royale
9th Trophée de l'Anniversaire
 3rd Trofeo Città di Brescia
2018
 1st Coppa San Geo
 1st Gran Premio San Giuseppe
 2nd  Road race, Mediterranean Games
 6th Puchar Uzdrowisk Karpackich
2019
 1st Trofeo Papà Cervi
 1st 
 9th Circuito del Porto
2021
 6th Overall Belgrade Banjaluka

Grand Tour general classification results timeline

References

External links
 
 

1995 births
Living people
Italian male cyclists
Cyclists from the Province of Brescia
Mediterranean Games silver medalists for Italy
Mediterranean Games medalists in cycling
Competitors at the 2018 Mediterranean Games